Wings of the Wild is the fifth studio album by Australian singer-songwriter Delta Goodrem. It was released on 1 July 2016, through Sony Music Australia. A follow-up to her last studio album, Child of the Universe (2012), it was her first studio album in four years.

The album was preceded by the release of its lead single, "Wings", which entered at number eight on the ARIA Singles Chart, ultimately topping the chart for two consecutive weeks. The album's second single, "Dear Life", was released on 6 May 2016, where it debuted and peaked at number three on the ARIA Singles Chart.

Background and development 
In June 2013, eight months after the release of Child of the Universe, Goodrem released "Heart Hypnotic" as a stand-alone single, which peaked at number seven in the ARIA Singles Chart in Australia, while appearing as a judge on The Voice Australia. This was followed by a cover of Martika's "Love... Thy Will Be Done in support of her tour with Italian singer Andrea Bocelli.

She then released "Only Human" in March 2015 to tie in with her appearance in soap opera Neighbours as her former character Nina Tucker, to celebrate the show's 30th anniversary. The album's first official single "Wings" was released in Australia in July 2015 and reached number one. Later in 2015, Goodrem was announced to star in the Australian production of the musical Cats in the role of Grizabella.

In a 2015 interview with Official Charts Company, Goodrem confirmed that she was working on her fifth studio album, stating "I've written a lot of songs for it already, but I'm going to finish it while I'm doing Cats, because I'll be stationed in the same place for three months, which for me is unheard of. I'll be tweaking every piano riff and guitar line and make sure it's the best record I've ever done. That's the ambition."

On 23 June 2016, Goodrem announced the album's title and release date. She described the album's themes as wildness, rawness and freedom.

The lack of romantic relationships as a theme for the album was described by Goodrem as "exactly what [she] wanted", explaining "I've been clear moving forward about what I want to share as a musician and in public. It was never me to share that side of me and that's a lesson I've learned along the way. In future, it will be private, I will be able to find the better balance. This chapter wasn't about (love), it was about me. If someone had walked into my life during that time, it still would have been about me, me having my time to be free, to be myself." For this reason, Goodrem had originally planned not to include her 2015 single "Only Human" on the album's track list, describing the song as sounding "broken", but later decided to "put it in the middle, it's the heart of the album and now it can connect with someone else going through that."

Singles
"Wings" was released as the album's lead single on 24 July 2015. The song debuted on the Australian ARIA Singles Chart at number eight in the week ending 9 August 2015; the following week, the track reached number one on the chart, keeping its position for two consecutive weeks. Not long afterwards, it became a Number One single in Latvia. The album's second single, "Dear Life" was released on 6 May 2016. The song debuted and peaked at number three, and became a surprise Number One in Ukraine. "Enough" was released as the album's third single on 24 June 2016, alongside the pre-order of the album. The song peaked at number 27. "The River" was released as the fourth single from the album; its music video premiered via-Facebook on 23 September 2016. The song, "Only Human", was released as a stand-alone single on 13 March 2015, but was later included on the final track listing.  The single peaked at number 46.

Critical reception 
 
The album received generally positive reviews from critics. Jessica Mule from Renowned For Sound said "You’d have to be deaf not to pick up on the less than subtle, ‘you can't pull me down anymore’, brazen, self-empowered motif of Deltas newest album" adding "We come to find through the albums deliberate lack of tracks about romantic love, that Delta is at her strongest in songs that resemble a need to uplift and encourage, motivate .. that it helps set her apart from the major players in the industry." adding "Wings of the Wild might just be Delta's strongest album since Innocent Eyes".

Cameron Adams from Herald Sun said "Wings of the Wild is her most confident and empowered release." Adams complimented the 'risks and experiments no one saw coming'".

David from auspOp said Goodrem has "created a great album of pop music. From start to finish, the album is a classic and timeless collection of tracks." adding "this is an album from a truly stunning Australian artist and is Delta's most consistent to date."

Bernard Zuel from Sydney Morning Herald was less favourable. He questioned 'who is Delta Goodrem?' particularly criticising the lyrics is "Dear Life", the 'meaningless strut' of "The River", the 'bombast' of "I'm Not Giving Up" and the 'bizarrely misunderstood cover' of "I Believe in a Thing Called Love".

Track listing

Charts

Weekly charts

Year-end charts

Certifications

Release history

See also
 List of number-one albums of 2016 (Australia)

References

2016 albums
Delta Goodrem albums
Sony Music Australia albums
Sony Music albums